Bhandup (Pronunciation: [bʱaːɳɖup]) is a suburban locality in Mumbai, in the state of Maharashtra, India. The name Bhandup is derived from Bhandupeshwar, one of the names of the Hindu god Shiva. An old temple dedicated to Lord Shiva, the Bhandupeshwar Mahadev Mandir, is located in Bhandup (west) near Moti Bai Wadi IDUBS high school. Sonapur signal is north lead line on L.B.S. Marg and south is dockyard colony. Bhandup railway station is on the Central line of the Mumbai Suburban Railway network. A few fast trains stop at Bhandup station, mostly during the peak hours.

History

Bhandup is one of the oldest suburbs in Mumbai. It is home to Shivaji Talao, or Shivaji Lake, named after the Maratha ruler, Shivaji. Devotees of Ganapati immerse idols of the elephant god Ganesh at the lake during the months of August through September, as well as in Bhandupeshwar Kundh in Bhandup Village East near the Eastern Express Highway.

The earliest records of Bhandup come from 1803, and show the contemporary Bhandup estate to comprise Bhandup, Nahur and Kanjur Marg.

The Silaharas, also known as Shilahara, were the rulers of this region with partial Dravidian ancestry who later mixed with the Prakrit speaking Indo-Aryan locals of Konkan. The Silaharas promoted socio-economic progress in the 11th century around Bombay. To control the regions in Bombay and Thane, the built the Rajapatha, passing from the north of Bhandup, following the current Bombay-Thane road.

Historical records indicate that the distillery at Bhandup was one of the two biggest sources of liquor in the Bombay Presidency, the other being the Uran distillery.

Bhandup was also one of the first railway stations in India. The first train ran between Bori Bunder and Thane on 16 April 1853 with 400 passengers aboard 14 railway carriages, at 3:35 pm. It is said that the idea to connect Bombay with Thane and Kalyan occurred to Mr. George Clark, the Chief Engineer of the Bombay Government, on a visit to Bhandup in 1843.

However, Bhandup was not a part of Bombay until 1950, when the boundaries of the Bombay municipal corporation were extended up to Andheri on the western side and Bhandup on the eastern side.

Demographics
Bhandup falls within the S-ward, as defined by the Municipal Corporation of Greater Mumbai. The population of Bhandup has risen exponentially in the last twenty years.

The discordance between population and density could be due to re-drawing of ward boundaries

The majority of residents of Bhandup are Hindus by religion. The dominant language is Marathi. Although a large percentage of the residents are natives of Maharashtra, in the last few decades, there has been a huge influx of non-native residents into Bhandup, reflecting the trend witnessed for Mumbai as a whole.

Economy

Industry
According to the 2001 census, there were 12,380 industrial establishments in Bhandup (S-Ward), providing employment to 36,921 residents of Bhandup. The rest of the employed populace are employed outside the limits of the S-ward.

One of the first industries to start in this area was Crompton Greaves in 1937, currently in Kanjur Marg. Currently, almost all of the industries in Bhandup are in Bhandup West, including CEAT Tyres, Asian Paints Ltd, BASF, and the Indian Smelting And Refining Company Limited. Apart from these big companies, there are several small-scale manufacturing units all over Bhandup West.

The presence of a large number of industries, coupled with large traffic flows throughout the day, led to Bhandup's air is one of the worst in Mumbai in 1999. However, several of the polluting industries have moved out of Mumbai since, leading to slightly better air quality.

Bhandup has Asia's biggest water filtration plant. The eastern sections of Kanjurmarg and Nahur blend into Bhandup without clear demarcation.

Retail
In recent years, several mall construction projects have been initiated in Bhandup. One reason for Bhandup being a prime location for malls is its proximity to affluent areas like Powai and Mulund. In the past few years, several industries in Bhandup have shifted or started shifting out of Mumbai, rendering vast tracts of land vacant. These land-plots are being used for the construction of huge residential complexes, in turn, providing the customer base for these malls.

Dreams the Mall, being developed by Satra Properties, is one of the biggest malls in Bhandup. It is located close to Bhandup Railway Station. Neptune Magnet Mall is a shopping mall that is part of a satellite township, Living Point, comprising six towers of 22 stories each being developed by Neptune group. Some of the other malls in the area include the Leo Mall and a shopping space being developed by HBS Centrix.

Transport
Bhandup is connected with the rest of the city through the road network. The arterial road of Bhandup West is the Agra Road i.e. L.B.S. Marg, while Bhandup East is flanked by the Eastern Express highway. Four buses (numbers 144, 453, 545 and 603), however, pass through Bhandup East, as the area is relatively sparsely populated. There is also a special bus service in the mornings for female commuters, going from Bhandup to Andheri. There is also a special State Transport Bus service in the morning which run between Bhandup and CWC (Navi Mumbai) and Navi Mumbai Municipal Transport Corporation runs a bus (route no 144) through Bhandup East which plies between Andheri East and Airoli.

Bhandup is also a railway station on the Central Line of the Mumbai Suburban Railway network, between KanjurMarg and Nahur.

Schools
There are over 35 schools in Bhandup. Most of these schools are affiliated with the Maharashtra State Board of Secondary and Higher Secondary Education.
 NES High School and Junior College
 Pawar Public School, L.B.S. Marg, Bhandup (W)
 Adarsha Vidyalaya Highschool & Junior College, Bhandup (West) 
 Adarsh Vidyalay, Bhandup East (Marathi medium)
 Ahilya Vidyalaya (Jamil Nagar)
 Ahilya Vidyalaya (Utkarsh Nagar)
 B.E.S English High School, Next to Railway station, Bhandup (East)
 B.P.E.S. High School, Pratap Nagar, Bhandup (W)
 Cosmos English High School & Jr. College Bhandup (West)
 Gurunanak English High School Bhandup (W)
 I D U B S High School and Jr. College Bhandup (W) 
 IES School, Bhandup East (English/Marathi medium)
 Navjeevan Vidyamandir & Jr. College
 New English School Dockyard Colony Kanjur West
 Pragatik Vidyalaya school Tembipada gavdevi Road Bhandup West.
 R.S.S Vidya Mandir English/Hindi Bhandup west
 Parag vidyalaya, Chhatrapati Shivaji Maharaj talav, Bhandup West, Mumbai - 78.
 Sahyadri Vidyamandir, Shivaji Talav, Bhandup West, Mumbai-78.
 Shree Saraswati Vidyamandir Bhandup (West)
 St. Francis Xavier's High School Bhandup (East)
 Mohammadi Urdu High School (Sonapur Bhandup)
 St. Xavier's High School & Jr. College Bhandup (West) 
 Yashwant Chandaji Sawant Vidyamandir, Utkarsh Nagar, Bhandup (West)
 Saraswati vidyalaya Kanjurmarg East

Colleges
Bhandup has five major accredited colleges, out of which two are in Bhandup (East) and three in Bhandup (West). All of them are affiliated to the University of Mumbai. The breakup is as follows:

Sports

Football
Bhandup has several Football clubs which are members of the Mumbai District Football Association (MDFA), including the Sunday Boys Football Club, the GKW Rangers, Ushanagar Youth CluB, DATAR CHAMP'S Football Club (DC), Samarth Garden Football Club (S.G.F.C), UshaComplex Football club (U.C.F.C). And Gunners Football Club and GN Boys and Loss Fc and  Satya Vijay Football Club (SVFC),Bhandup Sports Academy(BSA).

Bhandup also has its own football association called the Bhandup Suburb Football Association (BSFA).

Cricket
Bhandup has several cricket clubs.

Social organisations
There are several social organizations in Bhandup of which Sarvajanik Pooja Samiti Bhandup village east, founded in 1946, is the oldest, followed by Adrash Sports Club (1956), followed by Vijay Krida Mandal, Shree Saibhajan Sanskrutik Mandal (Bhandup), Vikas Mandal, Sai Vihar, Prajapita Brahma Kumaris Ishwariya Vishwa Vidyalaya, Jeevan Vidya Mission and the Rotary Club of Mumbai Bhandup.

Notable people
 
 
 Vinod Kambli - former India Test/ODI player. Grew up in a chawl in the Kanjur/Bhandup area
 Dhananjay Mahadik - Indian National Hockey Player
 Ashok Patil- MLC from Bhandup west
 Sanjay Dina Patil - ex-Member of Parliament-North-East Mumbai and Nationalist Congress Party
 Om Puri - Bollywood actor used to stay here before getting into Bollywood
 Sanjay Raut - editor of Saamana and Shiv Sena leader
 Rupali Repale - long-distance swimmer 
 Jemimah Rodrigues - Indian Women's Cricket Teams Youngest Player
 Ramchandra Sapre - chess master

References

Suburbs of Mumbai